Arthur Victor Sykes (born Swindon, 1902) was an English professional footballer. He played for Gillingham between 1924 and 1926, making seven appearances in the Football League.

References

1902 births
Year of death missing
English footballers
Gillingham F.C. players
Maidstone United F.C. (1897) players
Sportspeople from Swindon
English Football League players
Association football goalkeepers